Herbert William Garnet de la Hunt  (25 August 1933 – 28 April 2014) served as the Chief Scout of the Boy Scouts of South Africa, as well as the Vice-Chairman of the Africa Scout Committee, and was the first South African to be elected to the World Scout Committee, a member from 1996 to 2002 and held the post of chairman of the committee.
In 1994, de la Hunt was awarded the 234th Bronze Wolf, the only distinction of the World Organization of the Scout Movement, awarded by the World Scout Committee for exceptional services to world Scouting. On 27 April 2013 he received the Order of the Baobab.

References

External links

Recipients of the Bronze Wolf Award
Scouting and Guiding in South Africa
World Scout Committee members
Order of the Baobab
1933 births
2014 deaths